Cathodoluminescence is an optical and electromagnetic phenomenon in which electrons impacting on a luminescent material such as a phosphor, cause the emission of photons which may have wavelengths in the visible spectrum. A familiar example is the generation of light by an electron beam scanning the phosphor-coated inner surface of the screen of a television that uses a cathode ray tube. Cathodoluminescence is the inverse of the photoelectric effect, in which electron emission is induced by irradiation with photons.

Origin 

Luminescence in a semiconductor results when an electron in the conduction band recombines with a hole in the valence band. The difference energy (band gap) of this transition can be emitted in form of a photon. The energy (color) of the photon, and the probability that a photon and not a phonon will be emitted, depends on the material, its purity, and the presence of defects. First, the electron has to be excited from the valence band into the conduction band. In cathodoluminescence, this occurs as the result of an impinging high energy electron beam onto a semiconductor. However, these primary electrons carry far too much energy to directly excite electrons. Instead, the inelastic scattering of the primary electrons in the crystal leads to the emission of secondary electrons, Auger electrons and X-rays, which in turn can scatter as well. Such a cascade of scattering events leads to up to 103 secondary electrons per incident electron. These secondary electrons can excite valence electrons into the conduction band when they have a kinetic energy about three times the band gap energy of the material . From there the electron recombines with a hole in the valence band and creates a photon. The excess energy is transferred to phonons and thus heats the lattice. One of the advantages of excitation with an electron beam is that the band gap energy of materials that are investigated is not limited by the energy of the incident light as in the case of photoluminescence. Therefore, in cathodoluminescence, the "semiconductor" examined can, in fact, be almost any non-metallic material. In terms of band structure, classical semiconductors, insulators, ceramics, gemstones, minerals, and glasses can be treated the same way.

Microscopy 

In geology, mineralogy, materials science and semiconductor engineering, a scanning electron microscope (SEM) fitted with a cathodoluminescence detector, or an optical cathodoluminescence microscope, may be used to examine internal structures of semiconductors, rocks, ceramics, glass, etc. in order to get information on the composition, growth and quality of the material.

In a scanning electron microscope 
In these instruments a focused beam of electrons impinges on a sample and induces it to emit light that is collected by an optical system, such as an elliptical mirror.  From there, a fiber optic will transfer the light out of the microscope where it is separated into its component wavelengths by a monochromator and is then detected with a photomultiplier tube.  By scanning the microscope's beam in an X-Y pattern and measuring the light emitted with the beam at each point, a map of the optical activity of the specimen can be obtained (cathodoluminescence imaging). Instead, by measuring the wavelength dependence for a fixed point or a certain area, the spectral characteristics can be recorded (cathodoluminescence spectroscopy).  Furthermore, if the photomultiplier tube is replaced with a CCD camera, an entire spectrum can be measured at each point of a map (hyperspectral imaging). Moreover, the optical properties of an object can be correlated to structural properties observed with the electron microscope.

The primary advantages to the electron microscope based technique is its spatial resolution. In a scanning electron microscope, the attainable resolution is on the order of a few ten nanometers, while in a (scanning) transmission electron microscope (TEM), nanometer-sized features can be resolved. Additionally, it is possible to perform nanosecond- to picosecond-level time-resolved measurements if the electron beam can be "chopped" into nano- or pico-second pulses by a beam-blanker or with a pulsed electron source. These advanced techniques are useful for examining low-dimensional semiconductor structures, such a quantum wells or quantum dots.

While an electron microscope with a cathodoluminescence detector provides high magnification, an optical cathodoluminescence microscope benefits from its ability to show actual visible color features directly through the eyepiece. More recently developed systems try to combine both an optical and an electron microscope to take advantage of both these techniques.

Extended applications 

Although direct bandgap semiconductors such as GaAs or GaN are most easily examined by these techniques, indirect semiconductors such as silicon also emit weak cathodoluminescence, and can be examined as well. In particular, the luminescence of dislocated silicon is different from intrinsic silicon, and can be used to map defects in integrated circuits.

Recently, cathodoluminescence performed in electron microscopes is also being used to study surface plasmon resonances in metallic nanoparticles. Surface plasmons in metal nanoparticles can absorb and emit light, though the process is different from that in semiconductors. Similarly, cathodoluminescence has been exploited as a probe to map the local density of states of planar dielectric photonic crystals and nanostructured photonic materials.

See also
 Cathodoluminescence microscope
 Electron-stimulated luminescence
 Luminescence
 Photoluminescence
 Scanning electron microscopy

References

Further reading 

Electron beams set nanostructures aglow [PDF], E. S. Reich, Nature 493, 143 (2013)

Scanning Cathodoluminescence Microscopy, C. M. Parish and P. E. Russell, in Advances in Imaging and Electron Physics, V.147, ed. P. W. Hawkes, P. 1 (2007)
Quick look cathodoluminescence analyses and their impact on the interpretation of carbonate reservoirs. Case study of mid-Jurassic oolitic reservoirs in the Paris Basin , B. Granier and C. Staffelbach (2009)
Cathodoluminescence Microscopy of Inorganic Solids,, B. G. Yacobi and D. B. Holt, New York, Springer (1990)

External links
Scientific Results about High Spatial Resolution Cathodoluminescence

Electron beam
Light sources
Luminescence
Materials science
Scientific techniques